Melville George Holden (25 August 1954 – 31 January 1981) was a Scottish professional footballer who played as a forward. Active in both England and the Netherlands, Holden made nearly 150 career League appearances, scoring nearly 50 goals.

Career
Born in Dundee, Holden played for the youth team of Preston North End, and made his senior debut in 1972. He later played for Sunderland and Blackpool, before moving to the Netherlands to play with PEC Zwolle.

Later life and death
Holden died of motor neurone disease in early 1981, aged 26; the illness had forced his retirement from playing some two years previously. After his death, Preston player Peter Litchfield donated £1,000 he had received for winning a Man of the Match award to a motor neurone charity.

References

1954 births
1981 deaths
Scottish footballers
Preston North End F.C. players
Sunderland A.F.C. players
Blackpool F.C. players
PEC Zwolle players
English Football League players
Association football forwards